Hacker Halted is a global series of Computer and Information Security conferences presented by EC-Council. The objective of the Hacker Halted conferences is to raise international awareness towards increased education and ethics in IT Security. The event is currently in its 14th year. Also present at Hacker Halted is EC-Council's H@cker Halted | Academy, trainings and workshops led by EC-Council instructors and trainers.

Past Conferences

Hacker Halted india
Hacker Halted Malaysia was held in 2004, 2007, and in 2018 in New Delhi

Hacker Halted Egypt 2010
Hacker | Halted conference was held in Egypt on 13 and 14 December 2018

Hacker Halted india 
Hacker Halted Dubai was held in 2005 and in 2006 in Dubai, United A

Hacker Halted Singapore
Hacker Halted Singapore was held in 2005 in Singapore.

Hacker Halted Mexico
Hacker Halted Mexico was held in 2005 in Mexico.

Hacker Halted Japan
Hacker Halted Japan was held November 11, 2008 in Tokyo, Japan.

Hacker Halted USA
Hacker Halted USA was held in 2008 in Myrtle Beach, South Carolina

Hacker Halted USA was held in 20–24 September 2009 in Miami, Florida, at the Hilton Head hotel, and will include events to include a "Capture the Flag" event.

Hacker Halted USA was held in 2010 in Miami.

Hacker Halted USA was held in Miami on 25 and 27 October 2011.  The theme for 2011 was "Stop the Data Leaks. Secure the Code".

Hacker Halted USA was held in Miami on 29–31 October 2012.

Hacker Halted USA was held in Atlanta in 2013, 2014, 2015, 2016, 2017, 2018, 2019.

Hacker Halted was held on-line in 2021, 2022.

Upcoming Conferences

Hacker Halted USA 2019 returns to Atlanta, GA

Conference Tracks
Some of the talks will include tracks to include:
 
 Certified Ethical Hacker (CEH)
 Incident Response & Computer Forensics 
 Threats & Counter Measures 
 Governance, Policies & Standards 
 Business Continuity & Disaster Recovery 
 Mobile Security
 Virtualization Security 
 Secure Programming 
 Malware and Botnets 
 Social Engineering 
 Physical Security

H@cker Halted Academy
Hacker Halted USA 2009 was the launch of the Hacker Halted Academy. The Hacker Halted Academy is a series of classes presented by EC-Council partners. Many of the classes include EC-Council training and certification, including the Certified Ethical Hacker and Licensed Penetration Tester, as well as vendor specific certification, including, Certified Information Systems Security Professional(CISSP) and NSA NSA Information Security Assessment Methodology(IAM)/Information security Evaluation Methodology(IEM) training.

See also
 EC-Council
 Hacker conference

References

External links
 Hacker Halted Website
 Hacker Halted Academy
 Hacker Halted Egypt Website

Computer security conferences